The Department of Justice of the Generalitat de Catalunya is the Ministry of Justice part of the Executive Council of Catalonia, administering the justice system of the Catalonian self-government, the Generalitat de Catalunya.

Leadership
Established in 1931, the Minister of Justice is the highest representative
The current minister is Lourdes Ciuró.

Functions 
The functions of the Department of Justice correspond to:

 The functions related to the Justice Administration in Catalonia and its modernization.
 Penitentiary services, rehabilitation and juvenile justice.
 The conservation, updating and development of civil law in Catalonia.
 Associations, foundations, professional colleges and academies.
 Notaries and registrars.
 The promotion and development of alternative means of conflict resolution.
 Religious affairs
 The democratic memory, the promotion of peace and political and civil human rights.
 The regulation and supervision of interest groups.
 Any other attributed to you by law and other provisions.

Affiliated organisations
The Center for Legal Studies and Specialized Training and the Center for Contemporary History remain attached to the department.

See also
Justice ministry
The Ministry of Justice of Spain
Politics of Catalonia
The Public Prosecutor of the Autonomous Communities of Spain
Spanish Attorney General

External links

References

Government of Catalonia
Catalonia